Alan Tang Kwong-Wing (20 September 194629 March 2011) was a Hong Kong film actor, producer and director.

Early life

Tang was born in Guangzhou, Guangdong, China. He was the youngest of four children, having two older brothers and one older sister.

His secondary education was at the New Method College. After graduation, he received a full scholarship to the University of Hong Kong Law School. He deferred his acceptance to pursue an acting career.

Career
His first starring role was at age 16 in the 1963 film The Student Prince, a role he landed after some school friends showed his picture to the people making a movie at their secondary school. His role in this early movie earned him the nickname of "The Student Prince."

Upon graduation from secondary school, Tang acted in Hong Kong youth films starring Josephine Siao, Chen Chen, and Connie Chan Po-chu throughout the 1960s. Tang was often voted "Best Male Actor" by film magazines.

Tang found fame when he moved to Taiwan during the 1970s, where he had made over 60 feature films. The films he made were often dramas and romances, where he would often pair off with Brigitte Lin in such films as Run Lover Run.

It was reported that Tang made a salary of HK$150,000 per picture because of his popularity. In one 1974 article, Tang said that he was working on six movies at the same time; however, he only worked on one film a day and that made it difficult for producers. In 1974, Tang not only starred in The Splendid Love in Winter with Chen Chen, but he also produced it. Also that same year, the film Dynamite Brothers was released, co-starring with American Football hero Timothy Brown and James Hong. Tang continued his popular film career in both Hong Kong and Taiwan in the late 1970s. In 1977, Tang starred in director John Lo Mar's romance movie Impetuous Fire with up-and-coming teenage star Candice Yu. The movie was primarily shot in Macau, which opened up Tang's business ventures there.

Later in 1977, he formed the production company, The Wing-Scope Company.

With Tang working in Taiwan and his girlfriend at the time (Janet Yim) in Hong Kong, the pair had occasional difficulties, especially since the press reported their every move. Tang and Janet, however, remained together, in spite of living under constant scrutiny.

In 1987, Tang established another production company, In-Gear Film Production Co., Ltd., working alongside his brother, producer/presenter Rover Tang, and continued to produce and act in films, establishing himself as an action star. He appeared in a number of films—generally of the triad genre—such as Flaming Brothers, Gangland Odyssey, Return Engagement, Gun n' Rose and The Black Panther Warriors. He has also produced two films directed by Wong Kar-wai--As Tears Go By and Days of Being Wild.

Working with Wong Kar-wai
In the mid-1980s, Wong Kar-wai became a scriptwriter/director at Wing-Scope and In-Gear. He had written the scripts for the films, Return Engagement and Flaming Brothers, which both starred Tang.

Wong's current nostalgic artsy style took shape during his apprenticeship with Tang, who invested in the first movie Wong directed, As Tears Go By. Wong's career took off when he directed the film Days of Being Wild in 1990, despite Tang losing millions of invested dollars.

Later career
Following his retirement, Media Asia Group had gained rights to release his In-Gear film titles on DVD. Throughout the 1990s, Tang pursued a second career in the restaurant business.

Personal life
Tang was an active philanthropist in Hong Kong and mainland China as both an individual and an involved Rotarian. According to the posthumous memoirs of democracy activist Szeto Wah, Tang lent significant financial and material support to help activists flee from China after the Tiananmen Square protests of 1989. Szeto said Tang helped out Operation Yellowbird by exerting his great influence in Macau and "got involved personally to save time but he remained low-key and never claimed his share of glory."

On 29 March 2011, Tang died in his home in Ho Man Tin at around 9 pm from a heart attack.

Rape allegation

In December 2013, Next Magazine obtained the video of an interview with actress Yammie Lam in which she said that she had been raped by two "big brothers" in the Hong Kong entertainment industry more than two decades before. Lam stated that the first man, who had raped her after consuming alcohol, had died recently. In January 2018, Chinese journalist  uploaded what appeared to be the uncensored video of Lam's interview, which revealed the alleged rapists to be Alan Tang and Eric Tsang. Tsang has denied the allegation.

Filmography

Actor

Director
1977: 出冊/The Discharged
1979: 家法/Law Don

Producer
1973: 亡命浪子/Death on the Docks
1974: 冬戀/ The Splendid Love in Winter
1983: 怒拔太陽旗/ The Militarism Revival
1984: 有Friend冇驚/Winner Takes All?
1985: 開心三響炮/ Funny Triple
1985: 求愛反斗星/ Crazy Romance
1987: 江湖龍虎斗/Flaming Brothers
1987: 猛鬼差館/ The Haunted Cop Shop
1987: 香港小姐寫真 / Miss Hong Kong
1988: 我要富貴/ My Dear Son
1988: 旺角卡門/ As Tears Go By
1989: 捉鬼大師/ Vampire Buster
1990: 再戰江湖/Return Engagement
1991: 阿飛正傳/ Days of Being Wild
1992: 龍騰四海/ Gun n' Rose  
1993: 黑豹天下 /Warriors: The Black Panther

References

External links
 Alan Tang Filmography at HK Cinemagic.com
 
 

1946 births
2011 deaths
Hong Kong male film actors
Hong Kong film directors
Hong Kong film producers
People from Foshan
Male actors from Guangdong
Film directors from Guangdong